NGC 430 is an elliptical galaxy of type E: located in the constellation Cetus. It was discovered on October 1, 1785 by William Herschel. It was described by Dreyer as "faint, very small, round, very suddenly brighter middle similar to star."

References

External links
 

0430
17851001
Cetus (constellation)
Elliptical galaxies
004376